Elite capture is a form of corruption whereby public resources are biased for the benefit of a few individuals of superior social status in detriment to the welfare of the larger population. Elites are groups of individuals who, because of self-ratifying factors such as social class, asset ownership, religious affiliations, political power, historic discrimination among social groups, political party affiliation, or economic position, have decision-making power in processes of public concern. This specific form of corruption occurs when elites use public funds, originally intended to be invested in services that benefit the larger population, to fund projects that would only benefit them. This form of corruption is differentiated from outright criminal corruption such as embezzlement, misappropriation, or other diversion of funds by a public official. 

Elite capture is related to information asymmetry, inefficient regulation or inefficient allocation of resources. This causes a siphoning of resources by elite middlemen through legal practices such as noncompetitive tender of contracts, excessive pricing and overcharging, which result in fewer and fewer proportion of a government project's budget being spent on the declared mission. This causes a biased distribution of a public good or a service, resulting a situation wherein certain segments of the population experience reduced access to these public goods. In this context, as long as there is elite capture, the welfare impact will not be Pareto Optimal nor equitable.

Elite capture in decentralization
For long it was thought that creating decentralized governments would avoid the limitations of a single planner in society. A centralized government often lacks knowledge and might be subject of lobbying, leaving certain territories unattended. On the other hand, theory predicts that when people are involved in governing and have representation in decision making, public spending is supposed to be more efficient, more equitable and more sustainable. However, despite the theoretical predictions, the outcomes of many development projects in decentralized governments have not met these expectations. By yielding power to smaller units, money should be more efficiently distributed, but local governments are more vulnerable to pressure groups. Failure can occur when particular subgroups of the community are able to mobilize resources to further their own self-interest at the expense of the broader community. Local governments are even more vulnerable to capture by local elites than national governments. Attempts to reduce elite capture in decentralized governments range from going back to a heavily centralized planner to providing citizens with funds to initiate projects. This last option has been criticized because the citizens’ ability and skills to actually implement programs may be weaker than that of local leaders. According to the World Bank, development assistance is vulnerable to manipulation or hijack by elites, independently of the form that the assistance may take, because such aid it requires governmental or private agency to ensure transfer to households. It is in this intermediary stage where instances of elite capture are most common. Be it centralized or decentralized government, there is a risk of ineffective public resource delivery involved, where part of the local population will receive more than the rest of the local population. This situation has welfare consequences.

Alternative solutions
First, elite capture of public resources by local elites can be relatively lessened by the presence of media to balance the asymmetry of information. Empirical studies have shown that government responsiveness and accountability to ensure equal distribution of public goods and avoid elite capture is related to the availability of information and general levels of awareness among the local population. Second, the ‘counter-elite’ approach to deal with elite capture advocates challenging elites by completely excluding them in the implementation of projects. It assumes that all elites are inherently bad. By raising public awareness of power inequalities and building local capacity, this approach suggests that community empowerment and political citizenship would be effective in resisting elite domination. This approach is not necessarily effective in challenging elite domination, due to structural dependence of poor people on elites and the weakening of established institutions. Third, the ‘co-opt-elite’ approach suggests that cooperation with elites, rather than confrontation, is the solution to alleviating poverty. It asserts that not all elites are bad, and some of them can play a constructive role in community development. It also assumes a pragmatic use of elites’ networks and resources can benefit poor communities.  The ‘counter-elite’ approach is not necessarily effective in eroding elite power, and also risks legitimizing the authority of the elites and worsening inequality.

Similar Concepts

Elite capture and discrimination are very similar concepts because both imply unequal power status and denial of public resources. Social discrimination can promote elite capture, but is not an interchangeable concept. Elite capture is based on a state of an unequal power relations, whereas discrimination may or may not be the cause of an unequal distribution of power. Elite capture is a changing and dynamic process, and power structures change with it when a new elite arises. Discrimination is rather static in this sense. Elite capture is a manifested form of corruption, and social discrimination is a manifestation of a set of beliefs in a society. 
Elite capture and state capture are also similar because they are both related to deviation of public resources for private benefits, but differ in how power is exercised. Elite capture is carried out by an elite that is legitimately entitled some level of de jure power. State capture is carried out by elites that exercise de facto power (e.g. powerful unions or big multinational companies) that aim to have influence on the decision-making process of the institutions. However, both phenomena are both symptomatic of and a main reason for bad governance because they promote a vicious cycle, with long-term effects on institutional and bureaucratic performance.

Examples
 
An example of elite capture in the United States is to be found in the literature on the subject of iron triangles, wherein special interests are able to achieve disproportionately favorable outcomes from congressional committees and federal regulators. Oftentimes, personnel between each side of the iron triangle is interchangeable, a revolving door dynamic which is favorable to the development of capture of regulators by the entities they are supposed to oversee. Also, examples are found in most developing countries, where an increasing proportion of government and foreign aid is distributed through community-driven development but fail to properly reach the target population. 

Additional examples are male-dominated cultures where women may be disproportionately influenced by elite capture, since they tend to be excluded from the social elect and public services. It is a phenomenon that may even take place even where there is no clear indicators of ‘capture’ of power or corruption like access to education in rural areas of developing countries. While there are primary schools in the villages, they are somewhat dysfunctional due to lack of maintenance. As a result, children have to go to neighboring villages to study. Usually, girls are not sent far away from their villages, limiting their study years. Therefore, girls are systematically denied access to a public resource (education) as opposed to boys in the same village. The absence of an enabling social, political and economic environment can also encourage unintended elite capture. But at the same time, corruption and inefficiency appear to be a concomitant part of the elite capture problem.

Andersen et al. 2022 found that about 7.5 percent of foreign aid is diverted by elites.

Academic Approaches
As with many other activities related to corruption, there has been very few systematic attempts to measure and identify causes and consequences of this phenomenon in the economy. The concept itself is still in constant evolution because a majority of the evidence comes from non-experimental case studies or empirical data sets where there is very little consensus on the outcomes. A formal representation of the level of elite capture could be done by considering a single public service and measuring how the elite capture changes its own per-capita enjoyment as compared if it were equitably distributed. The idea is to consider how different the average consumption level of a certain public program would be if the average formal elites were eliminated. Empirical studies often analyze total welfare and utility function of a society. The idea is to identifying utility function of all households in three scenarios: current unequal distribution situation, with probability of equitable distributions and unavailability the public service or good to finally compare the data.

See also 

 Discrimination
 Elite theory
 Iron triangle (US politics)
 Land reform
 Regulatory capture
 State capture

References

Further reading

Elite theory
Political corruption